Elena Bovina and Mirjana Lučić-Baroni were the defending champions, having won the event in 2012, but both chose not to participate in 2013.

Anna Tatishvili and Coco Vandeweghe won the title, defeating Asia Muhammad and Taylor Townsend in the final, 3–6, 6–3, [13–11].

Seeds

Draw

References 
 Draw

John Newcombe Women's Pro Challenge - Doubles